The 2022 season for  is the 26th season in the team's existence and the fifth under the current name. The team has been a UCI WorldTeam since 2005, when the tier was first established. They use Lapierre bicycles, Shimano drivetrain, Shimano wheels and Alé clothing.

Team roster 

Riders who joined the team for the 2022 season

Riders who left the team during or after the 2021 season

Season victories

National, Continental, and World Champions

Notes

References

External links 

 

Groupama–FDJ
2022
Groupama–FDJ